Martin Harris (born 22 December 1955) is an English former professional footballer who made 107 appearances in the Football League playing on the right wing for Workington and Hartlepool United. He was on the books of Grimsby Town as a youngster without playing for their league side, and also played non-league football for Scarborough, Burton Albion and Cleator Moor Celtic. He went on to manage clubs including Cleator Moor Celtic and Whitehaven Amateurs.

Harris was born in 1955 in Doncaster, which was then in the West Riding of Yorkshire.

References

1955 births
Living people
Footballers from Doncaster
English footballers
Association football wingers
Grimsby Town F.C. players
Workington A.F.C. players
Hartlepool United F.C. players
Scarborough F.C. players
Burton Albion F.C. players
Crewe Alexandra F.C. players
Cleator Moor Celtic F.C. players
English Football League players
Northern Premier League players
National League (English football) players
English football managers
20th-century English people